The 2022–23 Maltese National Amateur League (referred to, for sponsorship reasons, as the IZIBet National Amateur League) is taking place between August 26, 2022 and April 23, 2023. This is the second season since the Second and Third divisions were unified into the two-group Amateur League system. The Maltese National Amateur League is Malta's third-highest professional football division. The 2022-23 League winners will be promoted to the Maltese Challenge League.

Teams 
Twenty-one teams competed in the 2022-23 League. These teams were split into two groups, one of eleven and one of ten.

Venues

League stage

Group A 
<onlyinclude>

Group A Results

Group B 
<onlyinclude>

Group B Results

Championship play-offs

Championship final

Promotion play-offs

Second-place Promotion Decider

Play-offs

Quarter-finals

Semi-finals

Play-offs final

Promotion final

Season statistics

Top scorers

Hat-tricks

Notes
6 Player scored 6 goals

Clean sheets

Discipline

Club
 Most yellow cards: 53
Dingli Swallows
St. George's
 Most red cards: 5
Dingli Swallows
Qormi
Siggiewi
St. George's

External links 
 Official website

Malta
1